Wijaya Football Club (abbrev: WFC) is a football club from Brunei that competes in the Brunei Super League. They are a founding member of both the B-League in 2002, as well as the Super League in 2012. They were also the inaugural winners of the Brunei FA Cup in 2002.

History

Early years 
In 1975, the club began as a bunch of under-14s competing at the Ong Sum Ping Field under the name Pekerma FC. The senior side Youngster FC, the club that served as an example and source of encouragement for the teenagers as they grew up, occupied the space the majority of the time. They would work out together, and five years after Youngster FC ceased to exist, Pekerma finally changed their name to the OSP Rangers as they took part in competitions.

Local successes 
Wijaya FC didn't get started until they registered for the Brunei-Muara District League in 1989. They made an impression in their first season, finishing second in Division II, which led to their promotion to the top division, where they competed from 1990 until 2001. They entered the B-League in 2002 as one of the top teams in the country and nurtured players that would become Bruneian household names like Wardun Yussof, Ratano Tuah and Norsillmy Taha. In the 2002 FA Cup final, Wijaya defeated MS ABDB 1–0 to claim their first trophy. Indeed it was the latter who scored the winning goal in the final of the first ever Brunei FA Cup. The next year, they won the Super Cup by the same margin against the same opponents.

After going undefeated in the second round, Wijaya added another trophy to his collection by winning the 2003 Brunei Premier League championship. In their final game, they defeated Indera SC 1–0 thanks to a goal from Norsillmy Taha, finishing two points ahead of DPMM FC. Twenty teams in all, divided into two groups, competed in the event, with Wijaya finishing second in Group B. In the second round, the top 10 teams went on.As the final fixtures were not played at the same time, Wijaya needed to rely on the result between DPMM FC and MS ABDB to keep their lead at the table, and it was the Armymen who performed a huge upset by beating the royally-owned club and hand Wijaya the title.

Present day 
For the 2007–2008 season, they reached the FA Cup final once more, but this time, the armymen came out on top 1–0. In 2016, Wijaya competed in the Super League again and finished in third place. In their most recent performance during the 2018–19 season, they finished third once more after collecting 37 points from 18 games. The club was in 6th place in the 2020 Super League when it was unexpectedly postponed and eventually cancelled due to the ongoing COVID-19 pandemic in the country, ending the tournament with only two matches completed. Wijaya came in third in Group C during the group stage of the 2022 FA Cup and failed to qualify for the knockout stage.

Current squad

Club officials

Honours

 Shell Helix B-League: 2003
 Brunei FA Cup: 2002
 Brunei Super Cup: 2003

References

Association football clubs established in 1989
1989 establishments in Brunei
Football clubs in Brunei